Rafael Ortiz Correa (July 12, 1914 – December 19, 1989) was a Puerto Rican pitcher who played in the Negro leagues in the 1940s.

A native of Guayanilla, Puerto Rico, Ortiz played for the Chicago American Giants in 1948. He died in his hometown of Guayanilla in 1989 at age 75.

References

External links
 and Seamheads

1914 births
1989 deaths
Chicago American Giants players
Puerto Rican baseball players
Baseball pitchers
People from Guayanilla, Puerto Rico